Art Scullion (born c. 1931, date of death unknown) was a Canadian football player who played for the Toronto Argonauts, Hamilton Tiger-Cats, and Calgary Stampeders. He won the Grey Cup with them in 1952. He previously played for the Toronto Balmy Beach Beachers. He died sometime between 1994 and December 1, 2000.

References

1930s births
Year of death missing
Calgary Stampeders players
Hamilton Tiger-Cats players
Players of Canadian football from Ontario
Canadian football people from Toronto
Toronto Argonauts players